HD 190647 b is >1.9 MJ planet orbiting the star HD 190647 at 309.7 gigameters or 10.04 μpc away from the star, taking 89.69 megaseconds to orbit the star with average velocity of 21.8 km/s. The orbital eccentricity is 18%. Dominique Naef discovered this planet in early 2007 by using HARPS spectrograph located in Chile.

See also 
 HD 100777 b
 Pipitea (planet)

References

External links 
 

Exoplanets discovered in 2007
Giant planets
Sagittarius (constellation)
Exoplanets detected by radial velocity